Fominskaya is a rural locality (a village) in Kolengskoye Rural Settlement, Verkhovazhsky District, Vologda Oblast, Russia. The population was 42 as of 2002.

Geography 
The distance to Verkhovazhye is 53 km, to Noginskaya is 1 km. Udaltsovskaya, Nivskaya, Noginskaya are the nearest rural localities.

References 

Rural localities in Verkhovazhsky District